The AITEO Cup (formerly Women Challenge Cup and Federations Cup) is a cup competition in Nigeria. Rivers Angels of Port Harcourt have won the most titles. The tournament along with Nigeria Women Premier League are the two recognized competition for women football organized by the Nigeria Football Federation. The finals are usually played at Teslim Balogun Stadium in Lagos State.

In June 2017, the Nigeria Football Federation finalized a five-year deal with AITEO Group for the naming rights of the competition. The deal will have the winners and runnerup get ₦10,000,000 and ₦5,000,000 respectively annually.
On 28 July 2019, Nasarawa Amazons won their second Aiteo Cup title, defeating Rivers Angels at the final.

Champions 
This is a list of champions and runners up since inception.

Most successful teams

Top scorers

Best players

Notes

References

Recurring sporting events established in 1991
National association football cups
Cup
1991 establishments in Nigeria